Xiakou is a town under the administration of Xixiang County, Shaanxi, China. , it has two residential communities and 11 villages under its administration.

References 

Township-level divisions of Shaanxi
Xixiang County